The Kuban-Black Sea electoral district was a constituency created for the 1917 Russian Constituent Assembly election.

The electoral district covered the Kuban Oblast and the Black Sea Governorate. The draft legislation for the election had included Kuban Oblast, the Black Sea Governorate, the Terek Oblast and the Dagestan Oblast into a single constituency. However, in the final law the constituency was delimitated to Kuban Oblast and the Black Sea Governorate. Originally assigned 14 seats, by decree of the Provisional Government the number of deputies of the Kuban-Black Sea district was increased to 16. Kuban was fully engulfed by civil war by the time of the vote. The election was only held in Ekaterinodar and some surrounding villages where the Kuban Territorial Council was in control, - and notably the vote was held February 2-6, 1918 (i.e. after the disbanding of the Constituent Assembly).

References

Electoral districts of the Russian Constituent Assembly election, 1917